Tampereen Kisatoverit(TKT) is a Finnish multi-sport club from Tampere. They have activity in football, gymnastics, arm wrestling, and volleyball.

Background
TKT was founded by workers of Tampella. It had a strong working class identity since the beginning and is a member of Finnish Workers' Sports Federation.

Football
Football was one of the main sports early on, and is still strongest sport of the club. Back in 1960 TKT played one season in finnish top flight mestaruussarja. Club operates in southeast Tampere and operates a training center in Aitolahti, north of Tampere.

Season to season

1 season in Mestaruussarja
18 seasons in Suomensarja
18 seasons in Kakkonen
31 seasons in Kolmonen
4 seasons in Nelonen

References

External links
 Official site
Finnish Wikipedia

Sports teams in Finland
Tampere
Sports clubs established in 1920
1920 establishments in Finland